William G. Stratton State Park is an Illinois state park in Morris, Grundy County, Illinois, United States. It is named after Illinois Governor William Stratton, and was developed in 1959 to provide public boating access to the Illinois River.  It features motorboat and jet-ski landing areas, and is bounded by the Illinois and Michigan Canal State Trail to the north and the Illinois River to the south.

References

State parks of Illinois
Protected areas of Grundy County, Illinois
Protected areas established in 1959
1959 establishments in Illinois